The United States women's national wheelchair basketball team began in the mid-1960s. The first women's team to compete alongside men in the Paralympic Games was in the inaugural 1968 tournament. A few years later in 1977, a women's wheelchair basketball division was created in the National Wheelchair Basketball Association (NWBA).

History
The United States women's national wheelchair basketball team began in the mid-1960s. The first women's team to compete alongside men in the Paralympic Games was in the inaugural 1968 tournament. A few years later in 1977, a women's wheelchair basketball division was created in the National Wheelchair Basketball Association (NWBA).

In December 2021, Trooper Johnson resigned as head coach of the women’s national team after current and former players alleged emotional misconduct.  He said he would cooperate with a United States Center for SafeSport investigation, and believed there would not be any findings.

Roster

2020 Summer Paralympics

<noinclude>

2019 ParaPan American Games Team 
Team USA at the 2019 Parapan American Games consisted of:

 Coach: Trooper Johnson

References

 
Wheelchair basketball in the United States
Wheelchair
National women's wheelchair basketball teams